Burjassot is a municipality in the comarca of Horta Nord in the Valencian Community, Spain.

Museums
The Museum of Geology at the University of Valencia is located on calle Doctor Moliner. It has several collections of geological and paleontological materials such as meteorites and fossils. There are also other items of historical value. In 1996, it was recognized by the Concierge Museum of Culture of the Ministry of Culture of the Generalitat Valenciana. It is developing an important role in conservation.

Notable people
 Sergio Ballesteros, former footballer
 Miguel Alfonso Herrero, footballer

Notes

References

External links

City Council

Municipalities in the Province of Valencia
Horta Nord